Callimoxys is a genus of long-horned beetles in the family Cerambycidae. There are about eight described species in Callimoxys.

Species
These eight species belong to the genus Callimoxys:
 Callimoxys fuscipennis LeConte, 1861
 Callimoxys gracilis (Brullé, 1832)
 Callimoxys nigrinus Hammond & Williams, 2011
 Callimoxys ocularis Hammond & Williams, 2011
 Callimoxys pinorum Casey, 1924
 Callimoxys retusifer Holzschuh, 1999
 Callimoxys sanguinicollis (Olivier, 1795) (blood-necked longhorn)
 † Callimoxys primordialis Wickham, 1911

References

Further reading

External links

 

Stenopterini
Articles created by Qbugbot